Tuddal Church is a parish church of the Church of Norway in Hjartdal Municipality in Vestfold og Telemark county, Norway. It is located in the village of Tuddal. It is one of the churches in the Hjartdal parish which is part of the Øvre Telemark prosti (deanery) in the Diocese of Agder og Telemark. The white, wooden church was built in a cruciform design in 1796 using plans drawn up by the architect Halvor Høgkasin. The church seats about 130 people.

History
The first church in Tuddal was a stave church that was likely built during the 13th century. This church burned down in 1369 and there was an investigation to see if it was arson. Records show that a man named Kjetil Karlsson was acquitted of being responsible for the fire by Bishop Magnus in Hamar. Kjetil is said to have lit a candle on the day the church burned, but witnesses could swear that he had extinguished it before he left. Despite the fact that this fire was shortly after the ravages of the Black Death, a new church was built the following year. The new building was also a stave church with an open-air corridor surrounding the nave and chancel. In 1796, the old church was torn down and replaced with a new cruciform church with a central tower that was built by Halvor Høgkasin. The tower was rebuilt in 1876, the year that is found on the wind vane. In 1957, a sacristy was built.

See also
List of churches in Agder og Telemark

References

Hjartdal
Churches in Vestfold og Telemark
Cruciform churches in Norway
Wooden churches in Norway
18th-century Church of Norway church buildings
Churches completed in 1796
13th-century establishments in Norway